Ali Kaya (born as Stanley Kiprotich Mukche on 20 April 1994) is a Turkish long-distance runner of Kenyan origin competing in the 5000 m and 10,000 m events. He holds the 10,000 m European record for juniors, set in 2013.

Career
He was born Stanley Kiprotich Mukche on 20 April 1994 in Eldoret, Uasin Gishu County, Kenya. In 2010, he moved to Turkey and adopted the Turkish name Ali Kaya. Following his naturalization in 2013, he became officially eligible to represent his new home country in international competitions on 20 June of the same year.

He won two gold medals, in the 5000 m and 10,000 m events, at the 2013 European Athletics Junior Championships held in Rieti, Italy. In the 10,000 m event, he set a new Turkish national record with a time of 28:31.16. He caused a scandal following the race when he abruptly left the championship for Kenya without showing up at the medal ceremony. Another Turkish athlete stood on the championship podium in Italy to receive his medal. According to the Turkish Athletics Federation, he travelled to Kenya in order to join a four-day training session in Kenya with his fellow countryman and naturalized Turk İlham Tanui Özbilen.

At the 2013 Islamic Solidarity Games held Palembang, Indonesia, Ali Kaya won a silver and a gold medal in the 5000-meter and 10,000-meter events, respectively.

At the European Championship in Zurich over 10.000 meters he competed against double Olympic champion Mo Farah, clinching a bronze medal after a fast finish. He became the youngest medalist ever in the European 10.000 final.

At the World Championships in Beijing 2015 he was one of only four athletes to reach the final of both the 10.000m and the 5000m. He finished 7th in 10000 m and 9th in 5000 m.

Kaya became the first Turkish person to win at the Istanbul Half Marathon in April 2016.

International competitions

References

External links
 

1994 births
Living people
People from Uasin Gishu County
Kenyan male long-distance runners
Turkish male long-distance runners
Kenyan male cross country runners
Turkish male cross country runners
Olympic athletes of Turkey
Athletes (track and field) at the 2016 Summer Olympics
European Cross Country Championships winners
European Athletics Championships medalists
World Athletics Championships athletes for Turkey
European champions for Turkey
Turkish people of Kenyan descent
Naturalized citizens of Turkey
Kenyan emigrants to Turkey
Islamic Solidarity Games competitors for Turkey